Sally Kirkland (1 July 1912 – 1 May 1989) was a manager at Lord & Taylor, a fashion editor at Vogue magazine and served as the only fashion editor at Life magazine between 1947 and 1969.

Early life
Born as Sarah Phinney in a small town called El Reno (about  West of Oklahoma City) in Canadian County, Oklahoma, she was the daughter of Col. Robert Truman Phinney and his wife Ruth Ida "Minnie" Naill.  She had one brother, Robert Phinney, Jr., who was a Vice President of Braniff International Airways.  In the 1920s and 1930s Sally lived in Washington DC with her parents. She graduated from Vassar College in 1934.  Sally was married in the early autumn of 1938 in New York City to Frederic McMichael Kirkland, the son of a wealthy Philadelphia Main Line family; their only child is the actress Sally Kirkland, her mother's namesake.

Career
After graduating from Vassar College in 1934, she worked in the college shop at Lord & Taylor, then the headquarters for the best casual American clothes.

Vogue
In 1939, Kirkland became an assistant editor of Vogue magazine and, by 1946, she was the magazine's fashion editor.

Life
Kirkland joined Life magazine after working as a correspondent in the Pacific during World War II, and from 1947 to 1969 she was the publication's fashion editor; Kirkland has been credited with making the weekly magazine influential in the area of international fashion. She was noted as the first fashion editor to do multiple-model sittings, in which a dozen or so models would be stretched across one and even two pages; her innovation was widely copied. She stopped traffic in the Place de la Concorde in Paris to get a fashion picture. A cover photograph of Sybil Connolly, the Irish designer, put Ireland on the fashion map.  She put Grace Kelly, Audrey Hepburn, Faye Dunaway and Jacqueline Kennedy Onassis on Life magazine as fashion icons.

She was one of a "trio of formidable and colorful women", the other two being Mary Letherbee, movie editor; and Mary Hamman, modern living editor. Together they led the "back of the book" at Life and were given free rein by Ed Thompson as managing editor and later editor in chief.  After she left the magazine, she wrote a book about designer Claire McCardell and contributed articles to the RAM Report, a monthly trade journal.

She was the first person to hire an African American - Gordon Parks - at LIFE magazine.

Awards
In July 1954 in Rome, the stylists Emilio Schuberth, Vincenzo Ferdinandi, the Sorelle Fontana, Giovannelli Sciarra, Eleanora Garnett and Mingolini-Guggenheim gave her a prize for her role as ambassador of Italian fashion in the United States during the "Alta Moda in Castel Sant'Angelo", in the evocative setting of the famous castle.

Kirkland also received in Florence at Palazzo Pitti the "Order of the Star of Italian Solidarity" in 1954 from the Italian Government for her reports on Italian clothes. "I was secretly pleased", she told a friend, "because the medal was green and gold and looked well on an orange evening dress I had to whip up for the affair."

Together with Grace Kelly and Vera Maxwell, Kirkland received a Neiman Marcus Fashion Award in 1955 for her contribution to fashion.

Death 
Kirkland died of emphysema, aged 77, at St. Vincent's Hospital, New York City. She lived on the Upper East Side of Manhattan.

References 

1912 births
1989 deaths
American magazine editors
Women magazine editors
Deaths from emphysema
Writers from Oklahoma City
Writers from Philadelphia
Fashion editors
20th-century American non-fiction writers
Journalists from New York City
Journalists from Pennsylvania
20th-century American journalists